Caryocolum schleichi is a moth of the family Gelechiidae. It is found in central, most of western and parts of eastern Europe, Morocco, Turkey, Syria, Afghanistan and Mongolia.

The length of the forewings is 4–7 mm for males and 3.5–6 mm for females. The forewings are dark brown, mottled with greyish white along the costa and dorsal margin. There are several white markings. Adults have been recorded on wing from late May to early October.

The larvae feed on Dianthus scaber toletanus, Dianthus deltoides, Dianthus arenarius and Dianthus sylvestris. They feed in the stalk of the host plant, which becomes gall-like. The larvae have also been recorded feeding in young shoots. Pupation takes place on the ground between leaf-litter. Larvae can be found in May and June.

Subspecies
Caryocolum schleichi schleichi
Caryocolum schleichi dianthella  (Chretien, 1925)
Caryocolum schleichi improvisella  (Rebel, 1936)
Caryocolum schleichi arenariella  (Benander, 1937)

References

Moths described in 1872
schleichi
Moths of Europe
Moths of Asia
Moths of Africa